is the facility of the National Diet Library, opened in October, 2002. It is based at the Kansai Science City in Seika Town, Soraku District, Kyoto Prefecture.

In 1978, a first basic concept of Kansai-kan of the NDL was shown as the "Second National Diet Library" by local governments, academic societies and businesses in Kansai region.  National Diet Library officially launched the Research Committee for the Kansai Project of the National Diet Library (NDL) in 1982. And the  second library was renamed as the Kansai-kan(the present name) in 1987.

References

External links
 
 Official site

Library buildings completed in 2002
Government of Japan
Japanese culture
Japan
Libraries in Japan
Buildings and structures in Kyoto Prefecture
Education in Kyoto Prefecture
2002 establishments in Japan
Kansai Science City
Libraries established in 2002